IEEE Transactions on Information Theory is a monthly peer-reviewed scientific journal published by the IEEE Information Theory Society. It covers information theory and the mathematics of communications. It was established in 1953 as IRE Transactions on Information Theory. The editor-in-chief is Muriel Médard (Massachusetts Institute of Technology). As of 2007, the journal allows the posting of preprints on arXiv.

According to Jack van Lint, it is the leading research journal in the whole field of coding theory. A 2006 study using the PageRank network analysis algorithm found that, among hundreds of computer science-related journals, IEEE Transactions on Information Theory had the highest ranking and was thus deemed the most prestigious. ACM Computing Surveys, with the highest impact factor, was deemed the most popular.

References

External links 
 
List of past editors-in-chief

Engineering journals
Information theory
Transactions on Information Theory
Computer science journals
Cryptography journals
Publications established in 1953